Corrasion is third studio album released by the Canadian drone doom band Nadja. Originally released in 2003 and limited to 200 copies, the album was rerecorded and re-released with three bonus tracks on August 13, 2007.

Track listing

Bonus tracks

Line-up
Aidan Baker - guitars, vocals, drum machines, production
Leah Buckareff - bass guitars

Additional notes
Track five on the rerelease, I Am as Earth, originally appeared on a split that Nadja did with Moss.
Tracks six and seven on the rerelease on Nadja compilation albums.

References

2003 albums
Nadja (band) albums